Manuka Oval is a sporting venue in Canberra, the capital of Australia. It is located in Griffith, in the area of that suburb known as Manuka. Manuka Oval has a seating capacity of 13,550 people and an overall capacity of 16,000 people, although this is lower for some sports depending on the configuration used. The area on which the ground is situated has been used for sport since the early 20th century, but was only enclosed in 1929. It has since undergone several redevelopments, most recently beginning in 2011.

Currently, Manuka Oval is primarily used for cricket (during the summer months) and Australian rules football (during the winter months). The ground was previously also used for rugby league and rugby union matches, but there are now more suitable venues in Canberra for those sports. As a cricket ground, Manuka Oval is the home venue for the ACT Comets (men's) and the ACT Meteors (women's) teams, and has also hosted a number of international matches, including at the 1992 and 2015 World Cups. As an Australian rules football ground, Manuka Oval's primary tenant is the Eastlake Football Club, which plays in the North East Australian Football League (NEAFL). Australian Football League (AFL) games are played at the ground on a semi-regular basis. The Greater Western Sydney Giants have used the oval as a secondary home ground since the club entered the AFL in 2012 and AFL Women's in 2017. Other AFL clubs had previously hosted games at the venue, most notably the North Melbourne Football Club from 1998 to 2006.

History 
The oval was originally a park officially known as "Manuka Circle Park", however by the end of the 1920s it was known as Manuka Oval. The park and nearby shopping centre were named after the Leptospermum scoparium's Māori name, Manuka. There was a push for the park to become an enclosed oval starting in 1926 by various sports groups. Work began on Manuka Oval to erect a fence, along with other improvements made in 1929. The field had previously been used to casually play rugby league and Australian rules football. The first cricket pitch was played on in April 1930. The Bradman Pavilion, the oval's main stand, was constructed in 1962 in honour of Sir Donald Bradman. The Robert Menzies Stand and the Bob Hawke Stand were constructed in 1987 and 1992 respectively and were named after the first two Australian Prime Ministers to bring international cricket teams to Canberra to play against the Prime Minister's XI. In 2004, Manuka Oval celebrated the 75th anniversary of its formal establishment.

Manuka Oval had a $4.3million upgrade starting from the second half of 2011, which included 4,300 additional temporary seats for the venue, new media and corporate facilities, upgrades to the Hawke and Bradman stands' covering and upgrades to entry facilities. Floodlights were installed at the ground in late 2012 to allow sport to be played at the venue at night, and were first used on 29 January 2013 for a day-night cricket match between the West Indies and the Prime Minister's XI.

Sports played at the ground

Cricket

The first cricket match to be played at the oval was on Easter Monday, 13 April 1930. The Prime Minister's XI is played at the oval annually. It was started by Robert Menzies in 1951, and there were six more matches up to 1965 in his term as Prime Minister. The match was brought back in 1984 by Bob Hawke and has been played annually since. In 1992, the ground hosted its first One Day International (ODI) match between South Africa and Zimbabwe as part of the 1992 Cricket World Cup, but otherwise remained largely unused for top level cricket.

In 2015, the ground hosted three One Day International (ODI) matches between Bangladesh and Afghanistan, West Indies and Zimbabwe, South Africa and Ireland as part of the 2015 Cricket World Cup.

The ground is home to the Canberra Comets, who played in the Mercantile Mutual Cup from the 1997–98 season to the 1999–2000 season; the team now plays in the Futures League.

Manuka Oval held its second ODI, and its first as part of a normal international tour, on 12 February 2008 between India and Sri Lanka in the Australian tri-series; and it hosted its first international match featuring Australia on 6 February 2013, in which Australia defeated the West Indies by 39 runs. Top level domestic cricket also returned to the ground from 2011 to 2012, with the New South Wales Blues for three seasons playing a Sheffield Shield and Ryobi One Day Cup match each season; and, the ground hosted the 2013/14 Sheffield Shield final, because the Sydney Cricket Ground was unavailable due to a Major League Baseball series.

The venue sought to host its first Test match in the year 2013 to celebrate the 100th anniversary of the establishment of the city of Canberra, however, the request was not granted.

The ground hosted the final of the 2014–15 T20 Big Bash on 28 January 2015. The first regular season BBL game was held on 24 January 2018 when the Sydney Thunder hosted the Melbourne Renegades. The first WBBL game at the venue was held on the same day.

In April 2018, it was confirmed that the Manuka Oval would host its first ever Test match in February 2019. The first test match was held on 1 February 2019 to the 5th of February 2019 between Australia and Sri Lanka, where four Australian batsmen made centuries.

Australian rules football
Manuka Oval was the home ground of the Manuka Football Club, an Australian Capital Territory Football League club, from 1928 to 1991, when it merged with the Eastlake Football Club. The merged club, which retained the Eastlake name, continues to play home games at Manuka Oval, both in AFL Canberra competitions and in the North East Australian Football League (NEAFL).

The oval has served as an occasional venue for Australian Football League matches since 1998, and a permanent home venue since 2012.

Between 1998 and 2006, the North Melbourne Football Club, hosted a total of eighteen matches at the venue, playing three games per season from 2001 onwards. Brent Harvey was the only player to have played all 18 AFL games featuring the Kangaroos played at Manuka Oval.

From 2007 until 2009, the Melbourne Demons and the Western Bulldogs each played a home match against the Sydney Swans at the venue; the Bulldogs continued this arrangement in 2010 and 2011.

Since 2012, the newly established Greater Western Sydney Giants have played three home-and-away matches and one pre-season match at the ground each year. The club's first ever AFL win, against the Gold Coast Suns in Round 7, 2012, took place at this venue. The record crowd for the ground was set when 14,974 attended for the match between the Giants and Richmond, a game the Giants won by 88 points holding Richmond to their lowest score, 3.5 (23). Manuka Oval also hosts the home matches of the Belconnen Magpies and Eastlake Demons in the North East Australian Football League competition as well as all eastern conference finals.

For three seasons beginning with the 2013 AFL season, Manuka Oval was branded as StarTrack Oval during Australian rules football matches. The naming rights deal expired in early 2016. Since 2017 until 2020 the venue has commercially been known as the UNSW Canberra Oval.

As of 2019, Jeremy Cameron holds the record for the most AFL goals kicked at Manuka Oval, kicking 49 goals.

Rugby league 
The second game of the 1948 Great Britain Lions tour was played at the Oval as the touring side beat the Group 8 Rugby League representative side 45–12. During the 1951 French rugby league tour of Australia and New Zealand, Les Chanticleers played a game at the oval against a Monaro side that attracted approximately 5,000 spectators.  Manuka Oval hosted one National Rugby League game on 29 May 2001 with the Canberra Raiders moving their game to the ground because of a clash with the ACT Brumbies.

Rugby union 
The Canberra Kookaburras (rugby union) played their home games at Manuka Oval when they competed in the Sydney competition from 1995 until they were excluded from the competition in 2000. The Kookaburras rugby union team rejoined the top Sydney competition in 2004 as the Canberra Vikings however opted to play their home games at Viking Park instead. The Canberra Vikings did make a return to Manuka Oval in 2007 for the Australian Rugby Championship and played three of their four home games at the ground. The other game was played at Canberra Stadium. However the competition was scrapped by the Australian Rugby Union at the end of the year.

Others
Manuka Oval has also previously hosted boxing and wrestling. In the inaugural year of the National Soccer League in 1977, Canberra City played its home games at Manuka Oval, but moved to the newly built Bruce Stadium in 1978. Hockey was also played at Manuka Oval until the National Hockey Centre was built.

Ground amenities 

A two-storey curator's residence is attached to the oval. It was built in the 1930s in the style typically used by the Federal Capital Commission. The trees that circle the oval include cypress, poplar, oak and elm trees, many of which were planted in the 1920s. The Jack Fingleton Scoreboard, originally located at the Melbourne Cricket Ground (MCG), dates to 1901. When an electronic scoreboard was installed at the MCG in the early 1980s, the old scoreboard was relocated to Manuka Oval. The scoreboard is named after Jack Fingleton, an Australian opening batsman, political correspondent in Canberra, and prolific author, who had died shortly before the board's relocation.

Attendance records

AFL attendance records

Cricket attendance records

References

External links

 
 
 ACT Cricket history of Manuka oval
 CricInfo's profile of Manuka Oval

 Manuka Oval CricketArchive

Australian Football League grounds
Sports venues in Canberra
Cricket grounds in Australia
Test cricket grounds in Australia
World Series Cricket venues
1926 establishments in Australia
Sports venues completed in 1926
Rugby league stadiums in Australia
North East Australian Football League grounds
AFL Women's grounds
1992 Cricket World Cup stadiums
2015 Cricket World Cup stadiums
ACT Meteors